Leucanopsis zacualpana is a moth of the family Erebidae. It was described by William Schaus in 1941. It is found in Mexico.

References

zacualpana
Moths described in 1941